Pidanguiyeh (also Romanized as Pīdangū’īyeh; also known as Pīdangū) is a village in Saghder Rural District, Jebalbarez District, Jiroft County, Kerman Province, Iran. At the 2006 census, its population was 75, in 23 families.

References 

Populated places in Jiroft County